The Reformatsky reaction (sometimes misspelled Reformatskii reaction) is an organic reaction which condenses aldehydes or ketones with α-halo esters using metallic zinc to form β-hydroxy-esters:

The organozinc reagent, also called a 'Reformatsky enolate', is prepared by treating an alpha-halo ester with zinc dust. Reformatsky enolates are less reactive than lithium enolates or Grignard reagents and hence nucleophilic addition to the ester group does not occur. The reaction was discovered by Sergey Nikolaevich Reformatsky.

Some reviews have been published.

In addition to aldehydes and ketones, it has also been shown that the Reformatsky enolate is able to react with acid chlorides,  imines, nitriles (see Blaise reaction), and nitrones. Moreover, metals other than zinc have also been used, including magnesium, iron, cobalt, nickel, germanium, cadmium, indium, barium, and cerium. Additionally, metal salts are also applicable in place of metals, notably samarium(II) iodide, chromium(II) chloride, titanium(II) chloride, cerium(III) halides such as cerium(III) iodide, and titanocene(III) chloride.

Structure of the reagent 
The crystal structures of the THF complexes of the Reformatsky reagents tert-butyl bromozincacetate and  ethyl bromozincacetate have been determined. Both form cyclic eight-membered dimers in the solid state, but differ in stereochemistry: the eight-membered ring in the ethyl derivative adopts a tub-shaped conformation and has cis bromo groups and cis THF ligands, whereas in the tert-butyl derivative, the ring is in a chair form and the bromo groups and THF ligands are trans.

Reaction mechanism 
Zinc metal is inserted into the carbon-halogen bond of the α-haloester by oxidative addition  1. This compound dimerizes and rearranges to form two zinc enolates 2. The oxygen on an aldehyde or ketone coordinates to the zinc to form the six-member chair like transition state 3. A rearrangement occurs in which zinc switches to the aldehyde or ketone oxygen and a carbon-carbon bond is formed 4. Acid workup 5,6 removes zinc to yield zinc(II) salts  and a β-hydroxy-ester 7.

Variations 
In one variation of the Reformatsky reaction an iodolactam is coupled with an aldehyde with triethylborane in toluene at -78 °C.

See also
Aldol reaction
Blaise reaction
Claisen condensation
 Example use in total synthesis: Mukaiyama Taxol total synthesis (B ring construction)

References

Addition reactions
Carbon-carbon bond forming reactions
Organometallic chemistry
Name reactions